North Hayling station was a halt on the single track Hayling Island branch, most often used to load oysters caught by local fishermen, but also ornithologists and ramblers. The station, along with the line was closed, in 1963. The station was located on the west coast of Hayling Island, very close to the coast. The station was very basic, with a timber concourse and  wooden shelter.  The station has been demolished and a section of the trackbed is now a footpath.

References

External links
 North Hayling station on navigable 1946 O. S. map

Disused railway stations in Hampshire
Former London, Brighton and South Coast Railway stations
Railway stations in Great Britain opened in 1867
Railway stations in Great Britain closed in 1868
Railway stations in Great Britain opened in 1869
Railway stations in Great Britain closed in 1963
1869 establishments in England
Hayling Island